Priekule Parish is an administrative unit of South Kurzeme Municipality in the Courland region of Latvia. The parish has a population of 653 (as of 1/07/2013) and covers an area of 152.8 km2.

Villages of Priekule parish 
 Asīte
 Audari
 Kalnenieki
 Kaņepji
 Knīveri
 Mazgramzda
 Saulaine

Parishes of Latvia
South Kurzeme Municipality
Courland